The Masonic Lodge No. 238 (also known as Masonic Hall), is a historic building in Dalton, Georgia. it was built in 1915.  It was listed on the National Register of Historic Places in 1996.

It is the home of Dalton Lodge No. 238, Prince Hall Affiliation

References

Clubhouses on the National Register of Historic Places in Georgia (U.S. state)
Masonic buildings completed in 1915
Buildings and structures in Whitfield County, Georgia
Masonic buildings in Georgia (U.S. state)
Dalton, Georgia
National Register of Historic Places in Whitfield County, Georgia